The Lakewood Cultural Center is a regional theatre and arts venue located in Lakewood, Colorado.

It includes a 320-seat auditorium, community room, gallery/exhibit space, classrooms and lobby space. It is designed for art and cultural programming and general community use.

The Cultural Center offers special engagements, nationally & internationally recognized artists presented by the City of Lakewood to perform or exhibit at the Cultural Center, and community presentations, performances or exhibits featuring work by local artists, schools and performing arts organizations.

External links
Official Website

Buildings and structures in Lakewood, Colorado
Art museums and galleries in Colorado
Buildings and structures in Jefferson County, Colorado
Arts centers in Colorado
Tourist attractions in Jefferson County, Colorado